The Fourth Chamber of Deputies of the Ottoman Empire was elected in the 1912 Ottoman general election. It was known as the Sopali Seçimler (the election of clubs) because of much electoral fraud and violence between the two main parties, Union and Progress and Freedom and Accord. It was in session for just five months until the Savior Officers shuttered the Parliament in a coup via memorandum.

Members

References

Sources 
 
 
 
 https://web.archive.org/web/20130723044738/http://coursesa.matrix.msu.edu/~fisher/hst373/Meclis-iMubasan1912.htm
 https://www.tbmm.gov.tr/tutanaklar/TUTANAK/MECMEB/mmbd02ic01c001/mmbd02ic01c001ink002.pdf

Government of the Ottoman Empire
1912 establishments in the Ottoman Empire
1912 elections in Asia
Ottoman Empire-related lists